A mulher do fim do mundo (or The Woman of the End of the World) is a studio album released by Brazilian singer Elza Soares (credited as Elza) in 2015. Soares, who was 85 when the album was released, recorded the album with the help of nearly three dozen producers, composers, songwriters and musicians including Victor Rice and figures from the vanguarda paulista scene. The album combines her usual style of samba with influences from jazz, afro-funk, noise rock and post-punk.

The album received critical acclaim upon being released internationally and would go on to appear in many end-of-year lists.

Composition

Style

Describing the album's sound, Philip Sherburne notes "the hardscrabble guitar-and-drum interplay; the horns, betraying the faintest hint of two-tone ska; and above all, her impossibly malleable voice, like a scrap of sandpaper turning into a tsunami." "The veteran samba singer’s voice is a polemical force in its own right," writes Ludovic Hunter-Tilney, "a low growl muscling through songs with outcast pride." The writer also notes a post-punk influence in the "abrasive" guitar-work and goes on to compare the track "Luz Vermelha" to a "tropical Fugazi." Sherburne similarly describes the album's combination of "Afro-Brazilian styles with wiry, dissonant strands of punk and noise-rock, where the Ex mingles freely with Tom Zé." Thom Jurek describes the track "Pra Fuder" as "electro-acoustic samba [...] framed by a clattering, bleating acid funk that recalls the Pop Group as it meets Fela's charging multi-horn grooves and swagger." He describes the track "Benedita" as "a rhythm collision where samba, jazz, and the punky friction of Gang of Four rub against one another, break apart, and recombine." The influence of jazz music is also mentioned by Michelle Mercer.

Themes

Soares had described to a producer that she wanted the album to be about "sex and blackness." Sherburne writes: "The album is part autobiography, part reinvention, and all provocation, channeling both her life’s pain and her incredible resilience into an alloy that is by turns jagged and molten." "The album doubles as a portrait of contemporary Brazil—" he continues, "a country beset by crises, including corruption scandals, the worst recession in over a century, a wave of police brutality, and a rising tide of anti-gay violence." The song "Pra Fuder" ("To Fuck") is described by Mercer as follows: "It's like after decades of strolling along as an object, the girl from Ipanema finally marched over, grabbed the guitar and sang her own wild desires." "Benedita" features a "multi-part narrative detail[ing] drug addiction, persecution of transgender and poor people by the police and celebrates the holiness of the oppressed." "Maria da Vila Matilde" is "about domestic violence, about showing the police a bruised arm. You get the sense she knows the subject all too well." The title track deals with themes such as "loss" and "endurance" whilst Sherburne also finds it to be "a heart-rending ode to samba, carnival, and the lifesaving qualities of music itself." The opening track "Coração do Mar" adapts a poem by Oswald de Andrade described as "a melancholy, imagistic meditation upon loss and slavery that becomes, in [Soares'] weary recitation, something like an inverse national anthem."

Release

"Maira da Vila Matilde" was the only single released from the album. The album itself was released through Circus Records in Brazil and through Mais Um Discos in the UK. The booklet accompanying physical copies contain English translations of the lyrics. A track-for-track remix of the album - End of the World: Remixes - was released in 2017, featuring contributions from Laraaji, Gilles Peterson, Mulú, DJ Marfox and many others. It was also released through Mais Um Discos.

Reception

The album received critical acclaim. Robert Christgau praised Soares' voice and wrote: "The collaboration makes complete sense. And there's nothing like [this album]." Sherburne called it "one of the year’s most original and exhilarating listens; that is equally true of its raucous, unorthodox fusions and its quietest, contemplative moments." Robin Denselow gave the album a perfect score and called it "the Brazilian album of the year." Jurek found the album "so nakedly emotional and powerful, it is ultimately an anthem."

Accolades 

Jon Pareles, Slate, Pitchfork, and Christgau would go on to include it among the best albums of the year, the first two ranking it in their respective top tens.

Awards 

The album won a Latin Grammy Award for "Best MPB Album". At the Brazilian Music Awards, it won for "Pop/Rock/Reggae/Hiphop/Funk: Album".

Track listing

Personnel

Elza Soares herself is uncredited in the liner notes.

Guilherme Kastrup - producer, additional engineer, drums, percussion, arrangements
Celso Sim - artistic director, music, lyrics, vocals
Romulo Fróes - artistic director, songwriter, vocals
Ernst von Bönninghausen - executive producer
Rodrigo "Funai" Costa - recording engineer
Marcelo Guerreiro - assistant engineer
Anderson Trindade Barros - additional engineer
Arthur Luna Beccaris - assistant engineer
Victor Rice - mixing
Felipe Tichauer - mastering
Oswald de Andrade - poetry
José Miguel Wisnik - music
Alice Coutinho - songwriter
Douglas Germano - songwriter
Clima - songwriter
Pepê Mata Machado - music
Joana Barossi - lyrics
Fernanda Diamant - lyrics
Cacá Machado - songwriter
Alberto Tassinari - songwriter
Kiko Dinucci - songwriter, guitar, repique, acoustic guitar, arrangements
Rodrigo Campos - songwriter, cavaco, guitar, featured, arrangements
Marcelo Cabral - songwriter, bass, bass synth, 7-string acoustic guitar, arrangements, string arrangements
Felipe Roseno - percussion, arrangements
Cuca Ferreira - flute, baritone saxophone
Aramís Rocha - violin
Robson Rocha - violin
Edmur Mello - viola
Deni Rocha - cello
Edy Trombone - trombone
Thiago França - baritone saxophone, tenor saxophone
Daniel Nogueira - tenor saxophone
Douglas Antunes - trombone
Daniel Gralha - trumpet
Bixiga 70 - arrangements
DJ Marco - pick-ups
Thomas Rohrer - rabeca
Sidmar Vieira - trumpet

Additional credits
 Alexandre Eça - photography

References

2015 albums
Elza Soares albums
Latin Grammy Award for Best MPB Album